Kennedy Glacier is a steep glacier,  long, flowing east from Kottmeier Mesa into the upper Matterhorn Glacier, Victoria Land, Antarctica. It was named by the Advisory Committee on Antarctic Names (1997) after Henry Kennedy, Deputy Director of the Antarctic Peninsula System for ITT Antarctic Services, 1985–90, with responsibility for Palmer Station and MV Polar Duke and procurement for RV Nathaniel B. Palmer. Kennedy worked on specialized technical projects with Antarctic Support Associates from 1990 to the time of naming.

References

Glaciers of Victoria Land
Scott Coast